Lee Hookey (born 6 April 1979) is an Australian former rugby league footballer who played in the 1990s and 2000s.

Background
Hookey was born in Sydney, New South Wales, Australia.

Career
Hookey made his first grade debut for South Sydney against Canterbury-Bankstown in round 1 1999 at the Sydney Football Stadium.  Hookey played in what was then South Sydney's last game as a club which was against the Parramatta Eels in round 26 1999 at Parramatta Stadium.  Following the conclusion of the 1999 NRL season, Souths were controversially excluded from the league as the NRL had deemed the club did not meet the requirements for the new 14 team competition.

In 2000, Hookey signed for St George and became a regular starter in the team.  In the 2002 NRL season, Hookey finished as the club's top try scorer with 18 tries.  

In 2003, Hookey rejoined South Sydney who were re-admitted to the competition the year prior.  Hookey was one of the key players for South Sydney although the club struggled on the field finishing last in 2003 and 2004.  

In 2006, Hookey signed for Penrith and played 17 games for the club as they missed out on the finals.  He retired in 2007.

References

External links
Lee Hookey Yesterdays Hero

1979 births
Living people
Australian rugby league players
Indigenous Australian rugby league players
South Sydney Rabbitohs players
St. George Illawarra Dragons players
Penrith Panthers players
Rugby league wingers
Rugby league centres
Rugby league players from Sydney